Fran Bennett (August 14, 1937 – September 12, 2021) was an American actress, known for her works in theater and on television. She portrayed the role of Mother Olivia Jefferson in a re-creation of the pilot episode of The Jeffersons in Live in Front of a Studio Audience: Norman Lear's All in the Family and The Jeffersons.

Life and career
Bennett was born in Malvern, Arkansas. She made her acting debut in theater, and her television debut on the daytime soap opera, Guiding Light. Bennett later had guest-starring roles in Roots: The Next Generations, Lou Grant, Dallas, Falcon Crest, Knots Landing, L.A. Law, and Dynasty.

Bennett had a regular role in the short-lived NBC medical drama Nightingales in 1989. She also had recurring roles in the daytime soap operas General Hospital, The Bold and the Beautiful and Sunset Beach. In prime time, she had recurring roles in Quantum Leap, In the Heat of the Night, Crisis Center and The Book of Daniel. In recent years, she appeared in Boston Legal, ER, Becker and Scandal. She played the coroner in an episode of Remington Steele January 14, 1986.

Bennett had appeared in a number of films, including Promises in the Dark (1979), How I Got Into College (1989), The Doctor (1991), Plymouth (1991), New Nightmare (1994), Foxfire (1996), The Next Best Thing (2000) and Jessabelle (2014).

From 1996 to 2003, she was head of the performance program in the School of Theater at the California Institute of the Arts.

In 2019, she portrayed the role of Mother Olivia Jefferson in a re-creation of the pilot episode of The Jeffersons in Live in Front of a Studio Audience: Norman Lear's All in the Family and The Jeffersons alongside Jamie Foxx as George, Wanda Sykes as Louise as well as Kerry Washington and Will Ferrell as Helen and Tom Willis respectively.

Bennett died in Los Angeles on September 12, 2021, at the age of 84.

Filmography

Film

Television

References

External links

1937 births
2021 deaths
American film actresses
American television actresses
Actresses from Arkansas
African-American actresses
20th-century American actresses
21st-century American actresses
People from Malvern, Arkansas
20th-century African-American women
20th-century African-American people
21st-century African-American women
21st-century African-American people